Alopoglossus avilapiresae is a species of lizard in the family Alopoglossidae. It is found in Brazil, Colombia, and Peru.

References

Alopoglossus
Reptiles described in 2020
Taxa named by Marco Antônio Ribeiro Jr.
Taxa named by Simón E. Lobos
Taxa named by Pablo J. Venegas
Taxa named by Omar Torres-Carvajal
Taxa named by Fernanda P. Werneck